Kiskimere is a census-designated place located in Parks Township, Armstrong County, in the U.S. state of Pennsylvania. As of the 2010 census the population was 136.

The community is located on the east bank of the Kiskiminetas River and is bordered by the community of Pleasant View to the south. To the west, across the river, is Allegheny Township in Westmoreland County.

Demographics

References

Census-designated places in Armstrong County, Pennsylvania
Census-designated places in Pennsylvania